The 1946–47 Providence Steamrollers season was the first season of the Providence Steamrollers.

Roster

Regular season

Season standings

Record vs. opponents

Game log

Transactions

Purchases

References

Providence
Providence Steamrollers seasons